Volume Four, Volume 4, or Volume IV may refer to:

Music
Lucio Battisti Vol. 4, Lucio Battisti's fourth album, released in 1971
Vol. 4 (Black Sabbath album), Black Sabbath's fourth studio album, released in 1972
 Volume Four, a 1992 album published by Volume magazine
 Volume 4 (Joe Jackson album), a Joe Jackson album released in 2003
Vol. 4, an album by Lullacry released in 2005
Volume IV: The Lions of Love, a 2007  album by Two-Minute Miracles
 All Hope is Gone (Slipknot album), Slipknot's fourth studio album, commonly referred to as 'Vol. 4' before its release in 2008
Volume 4: Songs in the Key of Love & Hate, Puddle of Mudd's fourth album, 2009
Volume IV (September Mourning album), an upcoming album by heavy metal band September Mourning
Volume IV The Classic Singles 88–93, a 1993 compilation album by Soul II Soul

See also